The inferior ganglion of the vagus nerve (also known as the nodose ganglion) is a sensory ganglion of the peripheral nervous system. It is located within the jugular foramen where the vagus nerve exits the skull. It is larger than and below the superior ganglion of the vagus nerve.

Structure 
The neurons in the inferior ganglion of the vagus nerve are pseudounipolar and provide sensory innervation (general somatic afferent and general visceral afferent). The axons of the neurons which innervate the taste buds of the epiglottis synapse in the rostral portion of the solitary nucleus (gustatory nucleus). The axons of the neurons which provide general sensory information synapse in the spinal trigeminal nucleus. The axons of the neurons which innervate the aortic bodies, aortic arch, respiratory and gastrointestinal tract, synapse in the caudal part of the solitary nucleus.

Function
The neurons in the inferior ganglion of the vagus nerve innervate the taste buds on the epiglottis, the chemoreceptors of the aortic bodies and baroreceptors in the aortic arch. Most importantly, the majority of neurons in the inferior ganglion provide sensory innervation to the heart, respiratory and gastrointestinal tracts and other abdominal organs as the urinary bladder.

Development 
The neurons in the inferior ganglion of the vagus nerve are embryonically derived from epibranchial neurogenic placodes.

Clinical Significance

References

Sensory ganglia